The Florida Everblades are a professional minor league ice hockey team based in Estero, Florida, in the Cape Coral-Fort Myers metropolitan area. They play in the ECHL and are affiliated with the Florida Panthers of the National Hockey League (NHL) and the Charlotte Checkers of the American Hockey League (AHL) starting in the 2022–23 ECHL season. Their home games are played at Hertz Arena.

The Everblades were founded in 1998. They play in the South Division of the Eastern Conference in the ECHL. They have failed to qualify for the playoffs just once in team history (2013–14) and have made five appearances in the Kelly Cup finals, winning in 2012 and 2022.

History

The team was founded in 1998 by Craig Brush, Peter Karmanos Jr., and Thomas Thewes and was named based on the Florida Everglades. The Everblades' logo features a gator-head design fused in the form of an ice skate. Barnstorm Creative Group, a Vancouver graphic design company, designed the logo. Barnstorm was contacted by Carolina Hurricanes owner Peter Karmanos Jr., who came up with the idea of choosing the Everblades' colors as blue and green, in tribute to the Hartford Whalers team that Karmanos moved to Raleigh, North Carolina. The Everblades' inaugural home opener featured a pre-game ceremony in which a large alligator was brought onto the ice to pay tribute to the team's name and logo, as well as Florida's vast population of reptile species.  The Everblades won their first Kelly Cup on May 23, 2012, against the Las Vegas Wranglers.  Brandon MacLean scored the championship-winning-goal in overtime during game five.  Everblades goaltender, John Muse, was named the most valuable player of the 2012 Kelly Cup playoffs.

2004 American Conference finals
In game five of the 2004 American Conference finals, the Everblades faced the Reading Royals in the final game of an epic series. Florida won the first two games at home, but Reading evened the series at home, the next two of the best-of-five series. In game five, the score was tied at the end of regulation, 2–2, so the game was sent to overtime. John McNabb of the Everblades scored on a breakaway to defeat the Royals in front of a record crowd of 7,080 fans at Hertz Arena.

2005 playoff brawl
One famous event that stands out among Blades' fans was during the 2005 ECHL playoffs. With the Everblades hosting the Greenville Grrrowl on April 22, 2005, for the first game of the American Conference semifinals, the teams engaged in a third-period line brawl that would see both teams combine for 197 minutes in penalties.

The brawl stemmed from previous incidents throughout the game. Prior to the brawl, Everblades forward Greg Hornby checked Greenville's Vladimir Gusev hard into the boards behind the net, causing Gusev to leave the game injured. As a result, the pace of the game, as well as checking, would pick up.

With the Blades up 4–1 with under six minutes to play in the third period, Greenville pest Krys Barch screened the net during a Greenville shooting attempt. Everblades defenceman Tim O'Connell checked Barch from behind numerous times, hoping to clear him from in front of the net. Barch, having been fed up with being pressured, turned around, attempting to sucker-punch O'Connell. Instead, O'Connell quickly skated away from the crease before Barch turned around. Barch ended up punching Everblades goalie Tyler MacKay. O'Connell then jumped on top of Barch, and all the players on the ice dropped the gloves for a wild line brawl that saw Florida goalie MacKay and others getting ejected for fighting.

After the mayhem, Craig Kowalski took MacKay's place as netminder. Shortly thereafter, the Everblades' Simon Tremblay fought Greenville's Adam Nightingale as the last fight of the evening. The Everblades went on to win the game, 4–1, and eventually to sweep the series, three games to none. Barch was assessed a one-game suspension for his role in the brawl.

Game two featured no fights and the Everblades won in overtime, 3–2.

2012 Kelly Cup Finals
Florida won the 2012 Kelly Cup playoffs with a 4–1 victory at home in front of a standing-room-only crowd of 7,290. The first period saw Las Vegas Wranglers goalie Joe Fallon beaten by Justin Shugg and Mike Ratchuk, but Las Vegas edged back to even the score by the third, with Ash Goldie and Peter MacArthur beating John Muse to force the overtime. At 4:54 into the overtime, after Ryan Donald passed to Matt Beca, who in turn sent the puck to Brandon MacLean, who beat Fallon and secured the victory.

The win earned Florida the 2012 Kelly Cup and secured a perfect home record of 11–0 in the postseason (two victories over Greenville and three each over Elmira, Kalamazoo, and Las Vegas). Additionally, John Muse earned the Kelly Cup Finals MVP award.

In April 2013, owner Peter Karmanos, Jr. announced he would be selling the team along with Germain Arena to "simplify things" in his life, as he had just retired from the company he founded, Compuware. The team was made for sale and was being shopped by Park Lane, a sports investment-banking firm that specializes in the sale of sports teams. In 2018, Karmanos gave up majority control of the Hurricanes to new majority owner Thomas Dundon. After the 2018–19 season, the Everblades dropped the Hurricanes affiliation for the first time and partnered with the Nashville Predators. It was then announced on August 5, 2019, that Karmanos had sold both the team and arena to David Hoffmann, a Naples, Florida, resident and real estate investor.

Logos
Through the Everblades' history, they have had four anniversary logos: the fifth anniversary logo in 2002–03, the 10th anniversary logo in 2007–08, the 15th anniversary logo in 2012–13, and the 20th anniversary logo in the 2017–18 season.

Season-by-season record

1 The 2008–09 team played 71 games because of scheduling changes caused by the Augusta Lynx and Fresno Falcons ceasing operations mid-season. Four of the five teams (Florida, Charlotte, South Carolina, Mississippi) played 71 games, with Gwinnett playing 72.

2 The 2019–20 ECHL season was suspended on March 12, 2020 due to the COVID-19 pandemic, and the rest of the season was cancelled on March 14, 2020.

Individual and Team Honors 
1998–99: John Brophy Award (Bob Ferguson)

1999–00: Brabham CupJohn Brophy Award (Bob Ferguson)Plus Performer Award (Andy MacIntyre)

2000–01: Executive of the Year (Craig Brush)

2003–04: Gingher Memorial Trophy

2004–05: Gingher Memorial TrophyReebok Goaltender of the Year (Chris Madden)

2005–06: Sportsmanship Award (Steve Saviano)Reebok Equipment Manager of the Year (John Jennings)

2008–09: Brabham CupCCM U+ Most Valuable Player (Kevin Baker)Leading Scorer (Kevin Baker)

2011–12: Gingher Memorial TrophyKelly CupKelly Cup Playoff's Most Valuable Player (John Muse)

2012–13: Leading Scorer (Mathieu Roy)

2015–16: ECHL CCM Rookie of the Year (Matt Willows)ECHL Community Service Award (Rob Florentino)

2017–18: Brabham CupGingher Memorial TrophyJohn Brophy Award (Brad Ralph)

2020–21: Brabham CupGoaltender of the Year (Jake Hildebrand)Plus Performer Award (John McCarron)

2021–22: Gingher Memorial TrophyKelly CupKelly Cup Playoff's Most Valuable Player (Cam Johnson)

Players

Current roster
Updated November 20, 2022.

Retired numbers

Berg and Buckley's numbers were retired during a pre-game ceremony on October 19, 2007, as the Everblades hosted the Mississippi Sea Wolves, in what would be the Sea Wolves' first official regular season game after being placed on a two-year hiatus due to the aftermath of Hurricane Katrina. Banners made with their jersey numbers were hung to the rafters of Germain Arena.

Hartlieb's number was retired in a ceremony before a game against the Orlando Solar Bears on October 19, 2012. Hartlieb was presented with an ECHL Championship ring (he filled in on with the team in the 2011-12 regular season, but did not appear in the playoffs), and hoisted the Kelly Cup. A banner made with his number was hung to the rafters of Germain Arena next to Berg and Buckley's.

Notable players
Florida Everblades alumni that advanced to play in the NHL after playing for the club:

 Mike Angelidis 
 Keith Aucoin 
 Clark Bishop
 Patrick Bordeleau 
 Eric Boulton 
 David Brine 
 Brett Carson 
 Scott Darling
 Kristers Gudlevskis 
 Matt Hendricks
 Hayden Hodgson
 Tanner Jeannot 
 Ty Jones 
 Anton Khudobin
 Connor Knapp 
 Greg Koehler 
 Greg Kuznik 
 Drew Larman 
 Chad LaRose 
 Martin Lojek
 Steven Lorentz 
 Brett Lysak
 Jeff Malott 
 Eric Manlow 
 Kenndal McArdle 
 Jason Morgan 
 Alex Nedeljkovic
 Tommy Novak
 Doug O'Brien 
 Ryan O'Byrne 
 Justin Peters 
 Justin Shugg
 Cole Smith 
 Dalton Smith
 Jared Staal
 Mark Stuart 
 Damian Surma 
 Brody Sutter
 Rob Zepp 

Florida Everblades that played in the NHL before playing with the team:

 Akim Aliu
 Ken Appleby
 Justin Auger
 Chris Beckford-Tseu 
 Brad Brown 
 Kevin Brown 
 Barry Brust
 Brett Bulmer
 Mike Card 
 Brad Church 
 Matt Corrente 
 Kevin Czuczman
 Trevor Daley
 Stefan Della Rovere
 Nicolas Deschamps
 Jon DiSalvatore
 David Dziurzynski
 Brad Fast 
 Paul Healey
 Riku Helenius
 Shane Hnidy
 Brayden Irwin 
 Bryce Lampman
 Nick Lappin 
 Pat MacLeod
 Tom McCollum
 Grant McNeill
 Mike Morrison 
 Kevin Quick 
 Brian Rafalski 
 Remi Royer
 Richard Shulmistra 
 Matthew Spiller
 Nick Tarnasky 
 Kris Vernarsky 
 Allen York

Franchise records and leaders

All-time franchise record holders

 Games Played: Mathieu Roy - 374
 Goals: John McCarron - 151
 Assists: Tom Buckley - 207
 Points: John McCarron - 354
 Power play goals: Mathieu Roy - 40
 Penalty minutes: Mathieu Roy - 560
 Goaltender Games Played: Marc Magliarditi - 139
 Goaltender Wins: Marc Magliarditi - 81
 Goaltender Goals against average (Min 15 games): Tyler MacKay - 1.92
 Goaltender Save percentage (Min 15 games): Anthony Peters - .934

Individual records and streaks
Individual records
 Most goals - game: 4 (5 times, last by John McCarron, Dec. 3, 2016 vs. Orlando)
 Most assists - game: 4 (12 times, last by Brandon Fortunato, Dec. 18, 2019 vs. Atlanta)
 Most points - game: 6 (twice, both by Jacob Micflikier, last on Nov. 5, 2009 at Charlotte)
 Most shots - game: 12 (3 times, last by Kevin Baker, Jan. 13, 2009 at Charlotte)
 Most penalty minutes - game: 37 (Kyle Kos Mar. 22, 2003 at South Carolina)
 Most saves - game: 58 (Rob Zepp, Dec. 27, 2003 at Gwinnett)
 Most saves - period: 25 (twice, last by Rob Zepp, Dec. 27, 2003 at Gwinnett (1st))

Individual streaks
 Consecutive game goal scoring streak: 9 (Keith Anderson 10/18/03 – 11/8/03 and Brendan O'Donnell 3/25/16 – 04/09/16)
 Consecutive game assist streak: 10 (Daniel Sisca (12/9/05 - 12/28/05))
 Consecutive game point streak: 16 (Tom Buckley (10/26/01 - 12/7/01))
 Consecutive games started streak: 15 (twice, last by Craig Kowalski (2/10/07 - 3/10/07))
 Longest winning streak: 9 (Tyler MacKay (2/25/05 - 3/19/05))
 Longest unbeaten streak: 11 (Tyler MacKay (2/19/05 - 3/19/05) (9-0-2))
 Longest shutout streak: 163:43 (Randy Petruk (11/3/01 - 12/14/01))

ECHL Hall of Fame
Former Florida Everblades goalie Marc Magliarditi was inducted into the ECHL's Hall of Fame on January 23, 2013.  Magliarditi played for the Everblades from 1998 through 2001.

Florida Everblades President and General Manager Craig Brush was inducted into the ECHL Hall of Fame on February 5, 2016. Brush has served as the team's President and General Manager since the team's inception in 1998 and he oversees all aspects of both the hockey club and the sports complex. Brush also served as the Chairman of the ECHL Board of Governors for three seasons from 2003 through 2006.

Awards and trophies

E.A. Gingher Memorial Trophy
The Everblades have won the E.A. Gingher Memorial Trophy five times, in 2004, 2005, 2012, 2018 and 2022. In 2004, the trophy was given to the champion of the Eastern Conference; the Everblades beat the Reading Royals 3–2 to win the conference but lost the Kelly Cup to the Idaho Steelheads. In 2005, the Gingher trophy was given to the American Conference champion. The Everblades beat the Charlotte Checkers 4–2 to win the conference before losing to the Trenton Titans in the Cup finals. In 2012, the Everblades won the Gingher Memorial Trophy by defeating the Kalamazoo Wings 4–1 in the Eastern Conference finals and went on to win the Kelly Cup over the Las Vegas Wranglers. In 2018, the Everblades went 12–2 through three rounds of conference playoffs and won the Gingher Memorial Trophy before losing the Kelly Cup in seven games to the Colorado Eagles. In 2022, the Everblades went 12–3 through three rounds of conference playoffs and won the Gingher Memorial Trophy by defeating the Newfoundland Growlers 4–1 in the Eastern Conference finals and went on to win the Kelly Cup in five games against the Toledo Walleye.

Brabham Cup
In the 1999–00, 2008–09, 2017–18, and 2020–21 seasons, the Everblades won the Brabham Cup, a trophy given to the team that has the best regular season record in the league. The Everblades took the trophy with 108 points in 1999–2000 and 112 points in 2017–18. The 2008–09 and 2020–21 trophies were awarded to the team with the best points percentage due to imbalanced schedules, where the Everblades had 0.725 and 0.667 winning percentages, respectively.

Kelly Cup
The Florida Everblades won the Kelly Cup in 2012 taking the series 4 games to 1 over the Las Vegas Wranglers. A decade later, they won the Cup in 2022 in another five game series, defeating the Toledo Walleye 4 games to 1.

References

External links

 The official Florida Everblades website
 The Official ECHL Website
 All-Time Everblades Roster

ECHL teams
Ice hockey teams in Florida
Ice hockey clubs established in 1998
Sports in Fort Myers, Florida
1998 establishments in Florida
Carolina Hurricanes minor league affiliates
Florida Panthers minor league affiliates
Nashville Predators minor league affiliates
Tampa Bay Lightning minor league affiliates